Beijing Film Academy (BFA) is a coeducational state-run higher education institution in Beijing, China.

History
Established in May 1950, the Beijing Film Academy was first named Performance Art Institution of the Film Bureau of the Ministry of Culture. During its first year, 38 students enrolled. For the next five years, the school was renamed thrice - Film School of the Film Bureau of the Ministry of Culture in July 1951, Beijing Film School in March 1953 and finally, Beijing Film Academy on June 1, 1956.

Upon its first establishment, the academy contained 2 schools - the School of Photography and the Animation School with the associated departments and their subsequent specialties. The Screenwriting Department was one of the earliest departments to be established at the academy in 1951.

Gradually, the academy expanded its number of schools and departments. On September 14, 1950, BFA offered its first undergraduate course in performing arts. The course attracted a class of 30 students, many of whom were notable figures in film and television. Due to its success, BFA established the Performance Institute in June 1956. In 1952, BFA offered its first programs in sound recording. The Department of Sound Recording was officially founded in 1959. The Department of Sound Recording continued to grow throughout the years. In 1960, BFA's Department of Sound Recording and the School of Engineering were joined together. BFA began offering a two-year course in film and television production management in September 1955. Although the first class only graduated 28 students, the popularity of the course grew, and a Department of Management was formally established in 1987.

In 1966, the Cultural Revolution brought hardships for schools throughout the People's Republic of China. BFA was equally affected; many of its professors left the academy. However, in the beginning of 1976, after the end of the Cultural Revolution, many faculty members returned to BFA. By 1977, the academy had recovered from the Cultural Revolution. Finally, in 1978, the academy allowed new students to apply.

Recent history
In 1989, the International School of the Academy was set up, along with the Information Research Center in October 1999.

Individual departments have also developed recently. Major development of the screenwriting department was the establishment of a postgraduate course with master's degree in Screenwriting in 1985, followed by the construction of the undergraduate program on Film Theories in 1987. Further postgraduate courses for Ph.D. students in Screenwriting were set up in 2004.

Academics
The academy offers associate, bachelor, and master's degrees in many areas of film. BFA offers courses in script writing, film theory, film directing, film and television production, film acting, film and television art design, advertisements, animations, sound art, cinematography, photography, and entertainment management.

Courses other than the undergraduate and postgraduate studies are also offered. These are:

 Correspondence courses
 Night school courses
 Vocational courses

Schools and departments

Presently, there are nine schools that make up the Beijing Film Academy:
Management School
International Studies School
Continuing Education School
Audio-Visual Arts and Communication School
Animation School
Photography School
Fine Arts School
Sound School
Performing Arts School

The eight departments and their twelve associated specialities are:
 Department of Film and TV technology/Digital Media Institute
 Digital film and television technology
 Film and television technology
 Film and television technology
 Department of Film directing
 Film directing
 Department of Film Theory
 Film studies
 Department of Management
 Film production management and distribution
 Department of Photography
 Cinematography
 Department of Screenwriting and Cinema Studies
 Film screenwriting
 Department of Sound Recording
Basic Education

Admissions

The admission rate at Beijing Film Academy is one of the lowest in the country, as well as globally. Admission is extremely competitive. Over 40,000 students apply annually to participate in entrance exams. Only 400-500 students are accepted. The majority of the admissions process takes place in February and March. The entrance examinations include subject tests as well as the National Humanities Examination. Prospective acting majors usually have the most intense competition. International students looking to study at Beijing Film Academy may apply through the International Training Center. In 2013, the Academy will conduct its first undergraduate film production program in English. This program will be conducted by the Cinematography department with a focus on cinematography, directing and post-production.

Notable alumni

For over forty years, graduates of the Beijing Film Academy have won national and international acclaim for their contributions to film and television. Their notable alumni include directors, producers, screenwriters, as well as actors and actresses. The majority of famous recent graduates are actors and actresses, as well as a few directors.

BFA's older famous graduates mostly consist of fourth-generation, fifth-generation, and sixth-generation directors. The most well-known fourth-generation directors include Wu Tianming, Wu Yigong, Teng Wenji, and Zhang Nuanxin. The three best-known fifth-generation directors all graduated from BFA (Tian Zhuangzhuang, Chen Kaige, and Zhang Yimou). Other famous Chinese filmmakers include Xie Tian, Chen Qiang,  Wu Yigong, Huang Shuqin, Wu Tianming, Xie Fei, Hu Mei, Zheng Dongtian, Ni Zhen, Ding Yinmeng, Li Qiankuan, Cao Cuifen, Huang Jianxin, and Wei Lian. Finally, notable sixth-generation directors include Jia Zhangke, Wang Xiaoshuai, and Zhang Yuan.

Chinese-American filmmaker Dayyan Eng, who after graduating won awards at the Cannes Film Festival and Venice Film Festival, was a transfer student to Beijing Film Academy's Directing Department.

Contemporary Chinese artist and activist Ai Weiwei studied animation at BFA.

Performance Institute
Note that class year indicates the entrance year, not graduating year.
 Class of 1978: Zhang Fengyi, Zhang Tielin
 Class of 1982: Zang Jinsheng
 Class of 1984: Wang Zhiwen
 Class of 1988: Jiang Wenli, Xu Qing
 Class of 1989: Faye Yu, Shao Bing
 Class of 1990: Jiang Wu, Huang Lei
 Class of 1992: Yuan Li, Li Yixiang
 Class of 1993: Jia Zhangke, Xiaolu Guo, Xu Jinglei
 Class of 1994: Jiang Qinqin, Chen Zihan, Jin Qiaoqiao
 Class of 1995: Yu Nan, Zuo Xiaoqing
 Class of 1996: Zhao Wei, Chen Kun, Huang Xiaoming, Zu Feng
 Class of 1997: Huang Haibo, Hai Qing
 Class of 1998: Miao Pu
 Class of 1999: Yao Chen, Yu Bo, Du Chun
 Class of 2000: Dong Xuan
 Class of 2001: Huang Shengyi, Wang Luodan, Jia Nailiang, Ariel Aisin-Gioro, Yao Xingtong
 Class of 2002: Liu Yifei, Jiang Yiyan, Luo Jin, Zhou Yang, Zhu Yawen, Xiong Naijin, Bonnie Bo
 Class of 2003: Zhang Jiani
 Class of 2004: Lu Chen
 Class of 2005: Yang Mi, Jiao Junyan, Yuan Shanshan
 Class of 2006: Zhu Yilong, Zhai Tianlin, Ma Tianyu, Peng Guanying
 Class of 2007: Zheng Shuang, Jing Tian, Zhang Ruoyun, Kan Qingzi, Lu Shan
 Class of 2008: Shawn Dou
 Class of 2009: Zhang Yunlong, Li Chun, Wu Jinyan, Liu Ruilin, Huang Mengying, Lai Yi, Tan Songyun 
 Class of 2010: Zhang Yishan, Yang Zi, Lin Siyi, Li Xian
 Class of 2011: Gulnazar, Zhou Dongyu
 Class of 2013: Chen Yao,  Wang Hao Xuan
 Class of 2016: Guan Xiaotong, Guo Junchen, Zhou Ye, Sun Anke
 Class of 2017: Wang Junkai, Eleanor Lee, Zhang Jingyi
 Class of 2018: Leo Wu, Song Zu'er, Huang Junjie, Zhuang Dafei, Zhong Lili
 Class of 2019: Chen Feiyu
 Class of 2020: Zhang Zifeng, Yan Xujia
 Class of 2021: Ding Chengxin

References

External links
 Official website 
 

 
Culture in Beijing
Universities and colleges in Beijing
Drama schools in China
Film schools in China
Educational institutions established in 1950
1950 establishments in China
Mass media in Beijing
Universities and colleges in Haidian District